is a 2003 live album by GO!GO!7188. The name translates in English as The September 21st Incident.

Track listing

CD
 Otona no Kusuri (大人のくすり Adult Medicine)
 Umashika Mono (うましかもの Stupid Things)
 Bungu (文具 Stationery)
 Thunder Girl (サンダーガール)
 Kanojo to Watashi (彼女と私 She and I)
 Nanashi (ななし Nameless)
 Ore wa Drummer (俺はドラマー I am a Drummer)
 Ruriiro (瑠璃色 Azure)
 Akai Sofa  (赤いソファー Red Sofa)
 Knife (ナイフ)
 Ame Nochi Ame Nochi Ame (雨のち雨のち雨 Endless Rain)
 Nukarumi (ぬかるみ Mud)
 Ukifune (浮舟 Floating Boat) (a character and chapter title from The Tale of Genji)
 Tokage 3-gō (とかげ3号 Lizard #3)
 Rock (ロック)

DVD
 Polaroid (ポラロイド)
 Koi no Uta (こいのうた Love Song)
 Jet Ninjin (ジェットにんぢん Jet Carrot)

GO!GO!7188 albums
2003 live albums